Yatağan is a town and district of Muğla Province in the Aegean Region of Turkey, about  to north of Muğla.

Sights of interest 
Situated in the heart of ancient Caria and, during the 13th - 14th centuries, of the territory of the Anatolian beylik of Menteşe, the district has several localities of interest rich in history. The region is also covered in large part by Mediterranean pine forests.

Turgut was called Leyne officially until recent date and is still called as such locally.

Another spot of interest is the village of Çaybükü on the road to Muğla. The village has an old and restored coffee house, Belen Kahvesi, mentioned in a nationally renowned song called "Ormancı", which has as theme a tragic event that took place there in 1946. The coffee house is a tourist attraction today both because of the curiosity aroused by the song and also due to its views of the surrounding plain. Once again, Çaybükü had a different official name, Gevenes, until the 1950s and that name is still used locally. An unsuccessful petition was even made by the inhabitants in 2006 for a return to the former name, but while the Ministry of Interior Affairs could accept Geven, it did accept Gevenes. The village is referred to by name in the song, under its former official name of Gevenes.

Yatağan Power Plant 

Since the 1990s the town has attracted world attention due to the ecological pollution by the nearby Yatağan Thermal Power Plant, one of the largest Turkey's coal-burning power plant, built in 1976. There have been campaigns to shut it down by Greenpeace since 1994, and several shutdown court orders have been issued, only to be overruled or ignored because of the energy shortage.

See also 
 Yatağan Thermal Power Plant

References

External links 
  

Populated places in Muğla Province
Districts of Muğla Province